In military terms, 109th Division or 109th Infantry Division may refer to:

 109th Infantry Division (France)
 109th Infantry Division (German Empire)
 109th Division (Imperial Japanese Army)
 109th Division (People's Republic of China)
 109th Rifle Division (Soviet Union)